The Men's Overall competition in the 2016 FIS Alpine Skiing World Cup involved 44 events in 5 disciplines: downhill (DH) (11 races), Super-G (SG) (8 races), giant slalom (GS) (11 races), slalom (SL) (11 races), and Alpine combined (AC) (3 races). The newly introduced Parallel Giant Slalom event at Alta Badia, Italy—which was included in the giant slalom season standings—was a relatively short Giant Slalom course that pitted the men against one another in a modified bracket-reduction format from a field of thirty-two qualifying skiers, eventually whittled down to just four final-round racers in a "large final" (for the championship) and a "small final" (for third).

27-year-old Marcel Hirscher of Austria won the overall title for the fifth consecutive time, tying two all-time records: most overall World Cup titles by a man (five, tied with Marc Girardelli of Luxembourg, and one less than the overall record of six held since 1979 by Annemarie Moser-Pröll), and most consecutive titles (five, also held by Moser-Pröll).

An odd incident threatened to mar the early season as a small, remotely-piloted camera drone, operated by broadcast media to give viewers a taste of the skiers' field of vision, crashed and narrowly missed Hirscher during his second run in the slalom at Madonna di Campiglio just before Christmas.  Hirscher nevertheless finished second in the race, but shortly after the incident, the International Ski Federation banned remotely-piloted vehicles from flying over their events as a matter of safety and concern for the welfare of their athletes, staff and viewers.

Through midseason, possession of the overall crystal globe for the season was closely fought between four-time overall champion Hirscher and two-time overall champion Aksel Lund Svindal of Norway, with Svindal actually in the lead, but on 23 January, in the legendary Streif downhill on the Hahnenkamm at Kitzbühel, Austria, Svindal fell and suffered a season-ending ligament tear in his right knee. Because of poor visibility and dangerous winds, which already had led the course to be shortened, the downhill produced three serious crashes in just 30 skiers, the minimum number for the race to be deemed official, before it was stopped—but the damage had already been done.

After Svindal's departure, Hirscher won the overall crystal globe by almost 500 points over Henrik Kristoffersen of Norway. In addition to Svindal and Kristofferson, two other Norwegians placed in the top 7 in overall points: Kjetil Jansrud and Aleksander Aamodt Kilde.

The finals were held in St. Moritz, Switzerland from 16 to 20 March 2016.

Standings

See also
 2016 Alpine Skiing World Cup – Men's summary rankings
 2016 Alpine Skiing World Cup – Men's Downhill
 2016 Alpine Skiing World Cup – Men's Super-G
 2016 Alpine Skiing World Cup – Men's Giant Slalom
 2016 Alpine Skiing World Cup – Men's Slalom
 2016 Alpine Skiing World Cup – Men's Combined
 2016 Alpine Skiing World Cup – Women's Overall

References

External links
 Alpine Skiing at FIS website

Men's Overall
FIS Alpine Ski World Cup overall titles